The 1996 Hog Wild was a professional wrestling pay-per-view (PPV) event produced by World Championship Wrestling (WCW) and the first in the Road Wild chronology. It took place on August 10, 1996 from the Sturgis Motorcycle Rally in Sturgis, South Dakota in the United States. The event took place on a Saturday instead of the Sunday more typical for pay-per-view events.

The event was notable for being the first pay-per-view event in WCW after the formation of the New World Order stable at the previous month's Bash at the Beach. In the main event, Hollywood Hogan defeated The Giant to win the WCW World Heavyweight Championship and spray-painted "nWo" on the title belt after the match. In other matches on the card, The Outsiders (Kevin Nash and Scott Hall) defeated Sting and Lex Luger while Ric Flair, Rey Misterio Jr. and Harlem Heat retained their United States Heavyweight, Cruiserweight and World Tag Team Championships respectively.

Storylines
The event featured wrestlers from pre-existing scripted feuds and storylines. Wrestlers portrayed villains, heroes, or less distinguishable characters in the scripted events that built tension and culminated in a wrestling match or series of matches.

Event 

The opening bout was a tag team match in which The Public Enemy (Rocco Rock and Johnny Grunge) defeated Rough and Ready (Dick Slater and Mike Enos. This match and the seven following matches aired on WCW Saturday Night prior to the pay-per-view broadcast.

The second bout was a singles match between Chavo Guerrero Jr. and Konnan. Konnan won the bout by pinfall after performing Splash Mountain on Guerrero Jr.
  
The third bout was a tag team match pitting High Voltage (Kenny Kaos and Robbie Rage) against The Nasty Boys (Brian Knobbs and Jerry Sags). The match was won by the Nasty Boys.

The fourth bout was a singles match between Alex Wright and Earl Robert Eaton. Wright won the bout by pinfall using a body press.

The fifth bout was a six-man tag team match pitting The Dungeon of Doom (The Barbarian, Meng, and The Taskmaster) against the makeshift team of Jim Powers, Joe Gomez, and Mark Starr. The bout was won by the Dungeon of Doom.

The sixth bout was a singles match between David Taylor and Mr. J.L. Taylor won the bout by pinfall following a fallaway slam.

The seventh bout was a singles match between Diamond Dallas Page and The Renegade. Page won the bout by pinfall following a Diamond Cutter.

The eighth bout was a singles match between Arn Anderson and Hugh Morrus. Anderson won the bout by pinfall following a DDT.

The ninth bout, and the first to air on the pay-per-view broadcast, saw WCW Cruiserweight Champion Rey Misterio Jr. defend his title against  Último Dragón. Misterio Jr. defeated Último Dragón to retain his title using a rana.

The tenth bout was a singles match between former tag team partners Ice Train and Scott Norton. Norton defeated Ice Train by submission using a Fujiwara armbar.

The eleventh bout was a singles match between Bull Nakano and Madusa, with the stipulation that the winner would be allowed to destroy the loser's motorcycle. The match ended when Nakano gave Madusa a bridging backdrop suplex but Madusa lifted her shoulder off the mat, resulting in Nakano herself being pinned. Following the match, Madusa destroyed Nakano's Honda motorcycle using a sledgehammer.

The twelfth bout was a singles match between Chris Benoit and Dean Malenko, with the premise that Malenko was aiming to collect a bounty that had been put on Benoit by The Dungeon of Doom. The match originally went to a time limit draw after 20 minutes, but was given two overtime periods of five minutes each. Benoit ultimately won the match by pinning Malenko using a roll-up following a distraction from his manager, Woman.

The thirteenth bout was a tag team match in which WCW World Tag Team Champions Harlem Heat (Booker T and Stevie Ray) defended their titles against The Steiner Brothers (Rick Steiner and Scott Steiner). Harlem Heat retained their titles after their valet Sister Sherri threw powder in Scott Steiner's eyes then their manager Col. Robert Parker broke his cane over Steiner's head, enabling Booker T to pin Steiner.

The fourteenth bout saw WCW United States Heavyweight Champion Ric Flair defend his title against Eddie Guerrero. The match ended when Flair applied a figure-four leglock to Guerrero, resulting in Guerrero being pinned.

The penultimate bout was a tag team match pitting The Outsiders (Kevin Nash and Scott Hall) against Sting and Lex Luger. The match ended when referee Nick Patrick seemingly accidentally fell into Luger's leg while he applied the Torture Rack to Hall, knocking Luger down and enabling Hall to pin him.

The main event saw WCW World Heavyweight Champion The Giant defend his title against Hollywood Hogan, the leader of the newly-formed New World Order (nWo) stable. The match ended when  Hogan's nWo stablemates Kevin Nash and Scott Hall came to the ring, enabling Hogan to hit The Giant with the title belt and pin him to become the new WCW World Heavyweight Champion. Following the match, Hogan's old friend The Booty Man came to the ring wearing an nWo t-shirt on and carrying a birthday cake for Hogan, only for Hogan, Hall, and Nash to attack him. Hogan then spray-painted "nWo" on the face of the WCW World Heavyweight Championship.

Reception
Kevin Pantoja of 411mania rated the event 7 out of 10 stars and praised it, with "Most pay-per-views after the nWo featured a good undercard and a poor main event scene. Here you had three really good to great matches in Mysterio/Dragon, Benoit/Malenko and Flair/Guerrero. There was some crap like the WCW Title match but this was still actually an enjoyable show and I did not expect that."

Results

References

External links 
 

Hog Wild
1996 in South Dakota
1996 World Championship Wrestling pay-per-view events
August 1996 events in the United States
Events in South Dakota
Professional wrestling in Sturgis, South Dakota